Pier Leone Ghezzi (28 June 1674 – 6 March 1755) was an Italian Rococo painter and caricaturist active in Rome.

Biography
Ghezzi was born and died in Rome. He trained under his father, Giuseppe Ghezzi, who also trained Antonio Amorosi. His father was  secretary of the Roman Accademia di San Luca, and Pier Leone joined the Academy in 1705. His essay painting, the Allegory of Gratitude, was donated to the institution for his admission, as was customary. He painted for various churches such as the Cappuccini of Frascati and San Onofrio of Urbino.

He was the godson of Carlo Maratta. Pier Leone is known for his frescoes in the Villa Falconieri of Frascati.

As a painter, his style changes quite much through the years, sometimes under the influence of French portraiture.

His pen and gouache caricatures are much freer in emotion than his state portraiture, and were much admired. They often depict named individuals or professions in satirical fashion. Ghezzi made an extensive and eclectic use of drawings and watercolors. Recent scientific discoveries include watercolors reproducing stones and marbles, which were in 1727 collected in a manuscript named "Studio di molte pietre", i.e. Collection of different stones, currently preserved at the Biblioteca Alessandrina of Rome.

Sources

Le pietre rivelate. Lo 'Studio di molte pietre' di Pier Leone Ghezzi, manoscritto 322 della Biblioteca Universitaria Alessandrina, a cura di Paolo Coen e Giovan Battista Fidanza, Roma: Istituto Poligrafico e Zecca dello Stato, 2011.

External links

617 objects related to Ghezzi at the British Museum
Three works after Ghezzi at the National Portrait Gallery, London
 Allegory of Gratitude at the Accademia Nazionale di San Luca

1674 births
1755 deaths
People from the Province of Ascoli Piceno
17th-century Italian painters
Italian male painters
18th-century Italian painters
Italian Baroque painters
Rococo painters
Italian caricaturists
18th-century Italian male artists